Bath Building Society is a trading name of the Bath Investment & Building Society, which is a building society, with headquarters in Bath, England. Set up in 1904 as a friendly society, the society now focuses on savings and mortgages. The mortgage business specialises in offering niche residential mortgage products to meet the individual demands of customers.  Popular products include rent-a-room and buy for university mortgages as well as products targeted at first-time buyers and retired customers. It is a member of the Building Societies Association.

References

Building societies of England
Banks established in 1953
Organizations established in 1953
Companies based in Bath, Somerset
1953 establishments in England